Myself ; Yourself is a Japanese animated television series, directed by Tetsuaki Matsuda, animated by the Japanese animation studio Dogakobo and produced by the Myself ; Yourself Production Committee, which is composed of Happinet Pictures, Marvelous Entertainment, The 5pb and Pony Canyon Enterprises. The series is based on the visual novel Myself ; Yourself by Yeti, adapting the source material over thirteen episodes. The episodes' plots follows Sana Hidaka and his  return to the town of Sakuranomori after leaving the town and his friends five years earlier.

The series was broadcast from October 3 to December 26, 2007, on TV Kanagawa, and later on Chiba TV, TV Aichi, TV Saitama, TV Osaka and AT-X. The AT-X broadcast was notably late, starting on November 22, 2007.

Two pieces of theme music are used for the series. The opening theme is "Tears Infection" by Kaori and the closing theme is Kanako Itō's . The singles for "Tears Infection" and "Kimi to Yozora to Sakamichi to" were released on October 24, 2007.

Seven DVD compilations, the first six containing two episodes of the anime, and the last containing the final episode were released. The first was released on December 21, 2007, and the second on January 25, 2008. The DVDs are distributed by Happinet Pictures.


Episode list

See also

List of anime based on video games

References
General

 
Specific

Lists of anime episodes